The Romanian Danube Flotilla is the oldest extant naval force on the Danube, dating since 1860, when the Romanian Navy was founded. It saw service during most of the wars involving Romania, and was the most powerful river naval force in the world during the Interwar period.

Beginning
During the 1877-1878 Romanian War of Independence, the Flotilla consisted of two armed steamers (one paddle steamer and one yacht), one purpose-built gunboat armed with one gun (Fulgerul) and one spar torpedo boat (Rândunica). The Flotilla's main success of the war was the sinking of the Ottoman monitor Seyfi by the torpedo boat Rândunica.

Pre-World War I expansion

1882

The first expansion of the Romanian Danube Flotilla took place in 1882. Two armored torpedo boats, Șoimul and Vulturul, were purchased from Yarrow in Britain, where Rândunica was also built seven years prior. These boats had a displacement of 12 tons, measuring 19 meters in length, with a beam of 2.5 meters and a draught of 1 meter. Power plant consisted of one 150 hp steam engine generating a top speed of 16.5 knots. Each boat had a crew of 8 and was armed with a single spar torpedo. Aside from increased dimensions and greater speed, the two boats were also fitted with bulletproof armour. These two boats were followed by three Rahova-class gunboats, also built in Britain at Thames Iron Works. With a displacement of 45 tons and a top speed of 8.5 knots, these small gunboats were each armed with one 37 mm gun and one machine gun. Also commissioned in 1882 was the 104-ton guard ship Alexandru cel Bun. The latter was used as a minelayer during the First World War. She measured 23 meters in length, with a beam of 4.6 meters and a draught of 1.5 meters. She was powered by 100 hp steam machinery, giving her a top speed of 9 knots, and could carry 12 tons of coal. Her crew amounted to 20 and her armament consisted of two 37 mm guns and two machine guns.

1888

The second expansion of the Flotilla took place in 1888, when three 116-ton Oltul-class gunboats were commissioned. These vessels measured 30.5 meters in length, with a beam of 4.1 meters and a draught of 1.7 meters. They were also built by Thames Iron Works and each was armed with one 57 mm gun and one 37 mm gun. Crewed by 30 men each, they had a top speed of 13 knots generated by 380 hp steam propulsion, carrying a maximum of 12 tons of coal.

1893-1894
Two consecutive expansions followed in the 1890s. In 1893, three 95-ton guard ships of unknown origin were commissioned. Each was armed with one 57 mm gun and two 37 mm guns, having a top speed of 13.5 knots. A further expansion followed in 1894, when four German-made torpedo boats were commissioned. Known as the Vedea-class, they were built at Schichau-Werke, having a displacement of 30 tons, measuring 20 meters in length, with a  beam of 3 meters and a draught of 1.5 meters. Each boat had a crew of 16 and a top speed of 10 knots. Armament consisted of one 37 mm Hotchkiss revolving gun, one machine gun and two spar torpedoes.

1906-1908

This was by far the greatest pre-war expansion of the Romanian Danube Flotilla. Between 1906 and 1907, a class of 8 British-built torpedo boats was commissioned. These 50-ton vessels, built by Thames Iron Works, were well-armed for their size: in addition to one 47 mm naval gun and one 6.5 mm machine gun, each boat also carried 4 torpedoes: two on spars in front of the vessel and two more amidships in torpedo dropping gear (carriages). They measured 30 meters in length, with a beam of 4 meters and a draught of less than 1 meter. These boats were also armored, having bulletproof sides and deck. They were powered by two compound engines powering two shafts, resulting in an output of 550 hp and a top speed of 18 knots. They could carry up to 7.6 tons of oil and had a crew of up to 20. Between 1907 and 1908, four large river monitors were commissioned. They were built in sections at STT in Austria-Hungary. Their sections were then transported to the Galați shipyard in Romania, where they were assembled and launched. Standard displacement amounted to 680 tons, increasing to 750 tons at full load. Each monitor measured 63.5 meters in length, with a beam of 10.3 meters and a draught of 1.6 meters. Power plant consisted of two engines and two Yarrow boilers powering two shafts, generating a total of 1,800 hp which resulted in a top speed of 13 knots. The monitors had a crew of 110 and a range of 1,500 nautical miles at a speed of 9.7 knots. Armor thickness reached 70–75 mm on the belt, deck, turrets and conning tower. Armament during World War I consisted of three 120 mm Škoda naval guns in independent armored turrets, one 120 mm Škoda naval howitzer, four 47 mm Škoda naval guns and two 6.5 mm Romanian-made Maxim machine guns.

World War I

During the First World War, the Romanian Danube Flotilla was deployed in coordinated operations with the Romanian Army, which prevented the Central Powers from advancing into the Danube Delta. The Flotilla made a significant contribution to the Battle of Turtucaia and later carried out the safe evacuation of the Romanian 9th division from the besieged city. During the summer and fall of 1917, in conjunction with the artillery of the ground troops, the Flotilla held the line against renewed German offensive in Moldavia. Throughout the 1917 operations, the artillery of the four monitors bombarded enemy naval positions scoring notable successes, under the skillful command of the Romanian Vice-Admiral Constantin Bălescu.

One of the more notable naval engagements fought on the Danube took place during the night of 27 August 1916, just after Romania joined the war. A group of three Romanian torpedo boats, led by Rândunica, attacked the Austro-Hungarian Danube Flotilla stationed in the Bulgarian port of Ruse, which consisted of five monitors and four armed river boats. The objective was to sink one of the monitors, but the attack failed in its immediate purpose, as only one barge loaded with fuel was sunk (by Rândunica, commanded by Captain Niculescu Rizea) and a quay was damaged by another torpedo. Due to this attack, however, the Austro-Hungarian Danube Flotilla (Commander Karl Lucich) retreated 130 km (81 miles) west along the Danube, stopping at Belene and subsequently taking extensive defensive measures. The three crewmen of Rândunica were received as heroes in Bucharest, and the retreated Austro-Hungarian warships were prevented from interfering in the subsequent battle of Turtucaia.

One of the eight 50-ton Romanian torpedo boats was sunk by a mine at the end of 1916. On 22 September 1917, Romania achieved its greatest naval success of the war, when the Austro-Hungarian river monitor SMS Inn struck a Romanian mine and sank near Brăila. She was later salvaged, but was still undergoing repairs when the war ended.

In February 1918, after the start of the Russian Civil War, Romanian forces in the Danube estuary captured one Bolshevik Russud-class landing craft.

Interwar and World War II

At the start of the 1920s, the Flotilla consisted of the four fore-mentioned monitors, plus three more received as war reparations from the former Austro-Hungarian Navy: Basarabia, Bucovina and Ardeal. As of 1941, these three monitors displaced between 450 and 550 tons and each was armed with two 120 mm guns. Six M-class patrol boats were also acquired from Italy. The seven remaining 50-ton torpedo boats were still in use, although three were relegated to border patrol by the end of the Interwar, their armament reduced to one machine gun. The three Oltul-class gunboats were still in service, and would remain so throughout the Second World War. These additions made the Romanian Danube Flotilla the most powerful river fleet in the world until World War II. The minelayer Alexandru cel Bun was only scrapped in the 1930s. Under the command of Rear Admiral Gavrilescu Anastasie, the Flotilla made an important contribution to the suppression of the 1924 Tatarbunary Uprising.

During the first month of Operation Barbarossa, the Flotilla fought several engagements against its Soviet counterpart, damaging two Soviet monitors and two patrol boats and sinking another patrol boat. The Romanian monitor Mihail Kogălniceanu also shot down one Soviet aircraft on 29 June 1941. Wartime additions to the Flotilla amounted to two small Czechoslovak-built minelayers (transferred from the Kriegsmarine).

The Flotilla today

References

Military units and formations of Romania in World War II
Romania in World War I
Military units and formations established in 1860
Riverine warfare
History of the Romanian Naval Forces